The 1998 Harlow District Council election took place on 7 May 1998 to elect members of  Harlow District Council in Essex, England. One third of the council was up for election and the Labour party stayed in overall control of the council.

After the election, the composition of the council was
Labour 38
Liberal Democrats 3
Conservative 1

Background
Before the election Labour had 40 of the 42 seats on the council, with only 2 Liberal Democrat councillors forming the opposition. 3 Labour councillors stood down at the election from Katherines with Sumners, Netteswell West and Tye Green wards.

Each of the Conservative, Labour and Liberal Democrats had candidates for all 15 seats contested at the election, with 2 seats available in Old Harlow ward.

Election result
Labour held 13 of the 15 seats they had been defending, but the council chairman John Young was defeated in Kingsmoor ward by 21-year-old Conservative Andrew Johnson, who became the youngest councillor on the council. The Liberal Democrats also regained Stewards from Labour, a seat they had previously lost at a by-election.

All comparisons in vote share are to the corresponding 1994 election.

Ward results

Brays Grove

Hare Street

Katherines with Sumners

Kingsmoor

Latton Bush

Little Parndon

Mark Hall North

Mark Hall South

Netteswell West

Old Harlow (2 seats)

Passmores

Potter Street

Stewards

Tye Green

References

1998
1998 English local elections
1990s in Essex